List of MPs elected in the 1910 United Kingdom general election may refer to the results of other of two elections that year:

List of MPs elected in the January 1910 United Kingdom general election
List of MPs elected in the December 1910 United Kingdom general election

See also
 1910 United Kingdom general election (disambiguation)